Illinois Route 146 (IL 146) is an east–west state highway in the U.S. state of Illinois. It serves the extreme southern region of the state, commonly called Little Egypt or the Illinois Ozarks. An east–west highway, it serves Hardin County, Pope County, Johnson County, Union County, and Alexander County. These are some of the least-populated counties in Illinois. IL 146 serves two sections of the Shawnee National Forest.

Route description 
IL 146 generally follows a land route of the Trail of Tears, a trail taken by bands of approximately 9,000 Cherokee who were forced to march through southern Illinois from November 1838 until January 1839 as part of a U.S. government mandated relocation.  In 2006, the state of Illinois designated IL 146 as a historic highway and route of the Trail of Tears. 

IL 146 intersects with two U.S. Interstate Highways: Interstate 24 at exit 16 near Vienna, and Interstate 57 at exit 30 near Anna.
   
IL 146 passes through an area of Illinois noted for scenic beauty and significant tourist visitation.  State-operated parks and recreation areas on or adjacent to IL 146 include, from west to east:

Union County State Fish and Wildlife Area near Jonesboro
Trail of Tears State Forest near Jonesboro
Cache River State Natural Area near Vienna
Dixon Springs State Park near Dixon Springs
Rauchfuss Hill State Recreation Area near Golconda
Rose Hotel State Historic Site in Elizabethtown
Cave-in-Rock State Park in Cave-in-Rock

The city of Jonesboro was the site of an open-air debate between Abraham Lincoln and Stephen Douglas in 1858.  The site of the debate is preserved as a picnic area and park in Jonesboro.

History 
SBI Route 146 originally ran from East Cape Girardeau east to Golconda. In 1937 it was extended east to Elizabethtown, replacing a leg of Route 34.  In 1942 the road was extended east to Cave-In-Rock. There have been no changes since 1942.

Major intersections

References

External links

146
Transportation in Alexander County, Illinois
Transportation in Union County, Illinois
Transportation in Johnson County, Illinois
Transportation in Pope County, Illinois
Transportation in Hardin County, Illinois